Želimir Vuković (Serbian Cyrillic: Желимир Вуковић; born in Adinkuru, France on April 29, 1983) is a Serbian alpine skier. He is a member of Radnički skiing club.

He represented Serbia and Montenegro at the 2006 Winter Olympics in Men's Slalom.

Vuković was a Serbian flag bearer at the 2007 Winter Universiade in Turin, Italy.

References

External links
Olympic biography
FIS profile

1983 births
Living people
Alpine skiers at the 2006 Winter Olympics
Olympic alpine skiers of Serbia and Montenegro
Serbian male alpine skiers